Long Marston Airfield was a Royal Air Force base between 1941 and 1954, situated approximately  south west of Stratford-upon-Avon near the village of Long Marston in Warwickshire.

It is now managed by Anthony Hodges, and is home to:
 Second World War airfield buildings
 Unusual F.C. Construction 'Mushroom' pillboxes
 Microflights Flying School
 Avon Microlight Club
 Freedom Sports Aviation - club and flying school; Chief Flying Instructor Simon Baker)
 MotorGlide - gliding club specialising in motorgliders
 the Shakespeare County Raceway dragstrip
 the Long Marston Clay Shooting Ground.

It is also well known as a venue for summertime music festivals, including Godskitchen Global Gathering, the Bulldog Bash, and the Phoenix Festival.

In 1981 the tv series Crossroads filmed there, ATV relocated the set of the Crossroads reception area to the Airfield to set light to it as part of the motel fire storyline.

In 1983 the Evesham Motorcycle Club hosted held the British Masters Grasstrack Championships at the Airfield.

Runways 
Main runway, hard surface: 04/22 (of which the SW third is used as a drag strip)
Grass strip: 02/20
Disused runway, hard surface: 11/29 (buildings, Sunday market, etc.)
Disused runway, hard surface: 16/34 (used for aircraft movements to hangars, driver training, etc.)

History
The airfield was previously RAF Long Marston a Royal Air Force station used for training during the Second World War. The station closed during 1954.

Future
On 26 November 2015, a Stratford District Council planning committee approved plans by CALA Homes to build 400 houses on the site, part of their proposed development scheme which aims to eventually feature 3,500 houses. As a consequence, the remaining airfield buildings will be demolished, the runways and drag strip removed and the businesses will be forced to close or relocate.

References
https://grasstrackgb.co.uk/evesham-1983/

Citations

Buildings and structures in Warwickshire
Transport in Warwickshire
Airports in the West Midlands (region)